Nathan Gaither (September 15, 1788 – August 12, 1862) was a U.S. Representative from Kentucky.

Born near Mocksville, North Carolina, Gaither completed preparatory studies.
He attended Bardstown College.
He studied medicine.
He was graduated from Jefferson Medical College and began practice in Columbia, Kentucky.
He served as assistant surgeon in the War of 1812.
He served as member of the State house of representatives 1815–1818.

Gaither was elected as a Jacksonian to the Twenty-first and Twenty-second Congresses (March 4, 1829 – March 3, 1833).
He was an unsuccessful candidate for reelection 1832 to the Twenty-third Congress.
He served as delegate to the State constitutional convention in 1849.
He was again a member of the State house of representatives 1855–1857.
He resumed the practice of medicine.
He died in Columbia, Kentucky, August 12, 1862.
He was interred in Columbia Cemetery.

The Dr. Nathan Gaither House, at 100 S. High St. in Columbia, was listed on the National Register of Historic Places in 1979.

References

1788 births
1862 deaths
People from Mocksville, North Carolina
Thomas Jefferson University alumni
American military personnel of the War of 1812
Jacksonian members of the United States House of Representatives from Kentucky
19th-century American politicians